Hazel Mae Barker (born April 7, 1970), known professionally as Hazel Mae, is a Filipino-Canadian sportscaster. She was the former lead anchor for the New England Sports Network's SportsDesk news program and most recently the anchor on MLB Network. Mae worked for Sportsnet until 2004, when she left to work for NESN SportsDesk.  Mae returned on November 14, 2011. Mae grew up in Toronto and began her sports broadcasting career hosting a sports update show on campus at York University.
Hazel Mae worked as a Field Level Reporter for TBS MLB Tuesday starting in 2022.

Broadcast career

Rogers Sportsnet
Hazel Mae anchored the morning edition of Sportsnetnews on Rogers Sportsnet, one of Canada’s all-sports networks. In addition to her duties on Sportsnetnews, Mae was the host of JZone, a weekly magazine show dedicated to all things Toronto Blue Jays, also owned by Rogers. Mae began her tenure at Rogers Sportsnet providing sports updates to Rogers Sportsnet radio affiliates throughout Ontario. In 2002, she and two fellow Sportsnet co-workers posed in lingerie in Urban Male Magazine.

NESN
Mae subsequently moved to Boston, where she became the lead anchor for NESN's SportsDesk from December, 2004, to June, 2008.  She also hosted The Ultimate Red Sox Show, NESN’s Red Sox week-in-review program and The Buzz, the Boston Bruins top-ten in-season show. On June 2, 2008, NESN announced Mae would be leaving the network at the end of the month and she made her final Sportsdesk broadcast on June 28. During her tenure at NESN, her popularity was reflected by her nomination to be considered for the first president of Red Sox Nation. The position eventually went to Jerry Remy.

MLB Network
In August 2008, it was announced that Mae would become a host/reporter on MLB Network.
Since 2009, she has appeared on Hot Stove, MLB Tonight, 30 Clubs in 30 Days, and Quick Pitch for the channel, as well as hosting the re-airing of Mark Buehrle’s perfect game. In 2011, she became host of a new program, The Rundown, along with Matt Yaloff.

Return to Sportsnet
On September 19, 2011 it was announced that Hazel would leave MLB Network and return to Sportsnet. It was announced on-air during the Toronto Maple Leafs game on November 3 that she debuted on November 14, as anchor of the 6pm edition of Sportsnet Connected. Mae anchored the 6pm edition of the show until July 1, 2015, when the 6pm edition was replaced by Tim & Sid. She currently works on Sportsnet broadcasts of Toronto Blue Jays games as their field-level reporter.

Personal life

She is married to former Major League Baseball first baseman Kevin Barker.

References

1970 births
Living people
Television anchors from Boston
Canadian expatriate journalists in the United States
Canadian television sportscasters
Filipino emigrants to Canada
Journalists from Toronto
Sports in Boston
York University alumni
MLB Network personalities
Canadian women television journalists
Major League Baseball broadcasters
American women television journalists
21st-century American women